The Stretch is a two-part British television crime drama mini-series, created and written by Stephen Leather and directed by Frank W. Smith. The series, produced by Paul Knight Productions, first broadcast on Sky One on 12 November 2000, concluding the following week. The series follows career criminal Terry Greene (Leslie Grantham), who is sentenced to life for a murder he didn't commit. His wife Sam (Anita Dobson) has two choices - to walk away from the criminal empire he'd built up, or to take it over.

The series was filmed between the UK and Spain in 1999, and was billed as the channel's “Event of the Week” for the week ending 12 November 2000. The Guardian called their chemistry in The Stretch “magical” and also praised “some tasty cameos and supporting performances.” The series' original score was composed by Dobson's husband, guitarist Brian May of Queen.

The series was later novelised by Leather himself, the first time that he had adapted a screenplay into a novel, rather than the other way round. It was published on 1 February 2001, three months after the series initially aired. The series was also released on VHS on 20 November 2000, but remains unreleased on DVD.

Casting
Notably, it was the first time that Grantham and Dobson had been reunited on screen after working together on EastEnders during the late 1980s. As such, much of the publicity surrounding the series made note of the pair's on-screen reunion. Producer Paul Knight commented; "It was Anita herself who suggested that Leslie play her on-screen husband. Over the years they had talked about working together again, but nothing had appealed before The Stretch."

Grantham added, "When I read the script, I felt as though the lead roles had been written with me and Anita in mind."

Cast
 Leslie Grantham as Terry Greene
 Anita Dobson as Sam Greene
 Nicholas Day as DCI Frank 'Raquel' Welch
 Daisy Beaumont as Laura Nichols
 Graham McTavish as Andy McKinley
 Alistair Petrie as Jonathon Nichols
 Jim Dunk as George Key
 Ben Robertson as Micky Fox
 Mark Cartmel as DI Doug Simpson
 Luke Goss as Warwick Locke
 Matthew Burgess as Jamie Greene
 Joan Campion as Grace Greene
 Hayley Wardle as Trisha Greene
 Jon Welch as Laurence Patterson
 Godfrey Walters as Preston Snow
 Chook Sibtain as Richard Asher 
 David Telfer as Supt. Mark 'Blackie' Blackstock
 James Smith as Supt. English

Episodes

References

External links

2000s British crime television series
2000s British drama television series
2000 British television series debuts
2000 British television series endings
Sky UK original programming
2000s British television miniseries
English-language television shows
Television shows set in the United Kingdom
Television shows set in Spain